The Northwest Mexican Coast mangroves is a mangrove ecoregion of the southern Baja California Peninsula and coastal Sonora and northern Sinaloa states in northwestern Mexico. They are the northernmost mangroves on the Pacific Coast of North America and the region is transitional between tropical and temperate seas.

Geography
The mangroves are located on both the Pacific and Gulf of California coasts of Baja California. Magdalena Bay is the largest area on the Pacific coast, along with San Ignacio Lagoon and Ojo de Liebre Lagoon, and on Cedros Island and Guadalupe Island off the coast.

The Sonoran and Sinaloan mangroves are found mostly in the deltas of the Yaqui, Mayo, and Fuerte rivers, along with Lechuguilla Bay near Los Mochis, Agiabampo Bay, Yávaros wetlands, Tóbari estuary, Lobos Bay, and the La Tortuga, Las Cruces, and Los Algodones estuaries.

Mangrove areas on the eastern coast of the Baja California Peninsula include El Mogote and El Conchalito on the Ensenada de la Paz.

Flora
Rhizophora mangle and Laguncularia racemosa are the dominant Pacific coast mangrove species. Because of the nutrient-limited conditions, the mangrove forests are generally low, growing up to one meter in height.

On the Sonoran coast, R. mangle, L. racemosa, Avicennia germinans, and Conocarpus erectus are the dominant mangroves.

Fauna
The food and shelter provided by the mangroves support communities of oysters, crabs, invertebrate larvae, and juvenile fish.

Seabirds and shorebirds use the mangroves as a source of food (invertebrates and fish), and as rest areas and winter residences. The mangroves also support migrating songbirds, raptors, and shorebirds.

The Sonoran mangroves are habitat for the San Blas jay (Cyanocorax sanblasianus) and the purplish-backed jay (C. beecheii).

Conservation and threats
Threats to the mangroves include coastal development, sedimentation, eutrophication, and deforestation. Mangroves in the Gulf of California are disappearing at a rate of 2% annually. Coastal development around La Paz destroyed 23% of the local mangroves between 1973 and 1981.

Protected areas
The San Ignacio and Ojo de Liebre mangroves are within the Vizcaíno Biosphere Reserve, which protects the mangroves as well as adjacent marine and upland areas. Guadalupe Island is also a biosphere reserve. Several mangrove areas in Sonora and Sinaloa are designated Ramsar sites.

See also
 List of ecoregions in Mexico

References

External links

Mangrove ecoregions
Ecoregions of Mexico

Geography of Baja California Sur
Geography of Sinaloa
Geography of Sonora
Wetlands of Mexico
Nearctic ecoregions
Temperate Northern Pacific